Alexander Sergeevich Yashankin (born 5 June 1952) is a professional Russian bodybuilder and powerlifter. He holds eleven bodybuilding world titles in different age categories.

Anthropometry 
 Height – 170 cm
 Weight – 80–90 kg
 Squat – 250 kg
 Deadlift – 270 kg
 Push Rod Classic – 200 kg
 Jerk rod – 160 kg
 Bench press – 175 kg
 Biceps – 44 cm
 The volume of the chest as you exhale – 110 cm
 The volume of the chest on inhalation  – 117 cm
 Thigh – 66–67 cm
 Waist – 80 cm
 Shin – 43.5 cm

Career 
Alexander worked at Dimitrovgrad for 35 years as a coach. He dedicated 10 years to powerlifting. He took first place at the bodybuilding championships in Tolyatti in 1989. He has won the majority of championships since that date. He lives and works in Yekaterinburg.

Awards 
 In 2016, voted the best fitness trainer Ekaterinburg.
 According to the channel "Iron World" is recognized as a successful athlete.
 Best in the category "Sports" in the magazine "EKB.Sobaka.ru».

World Championships 
 Spain, the Torrevieja 1993 year, 1st place
 Poland, "mixed couple", 1993, 2nd place
 Turkey, the Izmir, 1994, 2nd place
 Poland of Katowice, 1995, 1st place
 Slovakia of Bratislava, 1996, 1st place
 Slovakia of Bratislava, "mixed couple", 1997, 2nd place
 Spain, the Alicante 2001, 1st place
 Canary Islands, Tenerife, 2003, 1st place
 Hungary of Budapest 2005, 1st place
 Spain, Sicily, in 2006, 2nd place
 Hungary of Budapest, 2007, 1st place
 Czech Republic of Brno 2008, 1st place
 Turkey, in 2010, 3rd place.
 Hungary of Budapest, 2012, the 1st place.
 Mongolia of Ulaanbaatar, 2013, 1st place.
 Mexico, Morelia, 2014, 1st place.
 Dominican Republic of Santo Domingo, in 2016, the 1st place.

European Championships 
 Russia, Tyumen, 1994, 2nd place in the standings, and 1st place in the team
 Turkey, İstanbul, 1995, 3rd place
 Russia, Tyumen, 2007, 1st place

References

External links 

 Legend of bodybuilding
 Interview following the 11th victory in the World Cup
 About Yashankin 

Russian bodybuilders 
1952 births
Living people
Sportspeople from Tatarstan